Leuconitocris leucostigma is a species of beetle in the family Cerambycidae. It was described by Harold in 1878. It has a wide distribution in Africa.

Varietas
 Leuconitocris leucostigma var. albosignata (Breuning, 1950)
 Leuconitocris leucostigma var. ochrescens (Breuning, 1956)

References

Leuconitocris
Beetles described in 1878